Margot Botsford (born March 16, 1947, in New York, New York) is an American lawyer and jurist from Massachusetts. She was appointed by Governor Deval Patrick in 2007 to serve as an associate justice of the Massachusetts Supreme Judicial Court.

Biography
Botsford graduated magna cum laude with a B.A. from Barnard College in 1969. At Barnard, she was a member of the Phi Beta Kappa Society. She earned her J.D. degree from Northeastern University School of Law in 1973. She later earned a Master of Public Administration degree from the John F. Kennedy School of Government at Harvard University in 2007.

Upon graduating law school in 1973, Botsford served as a law clerk to Massachusetts Supreme Judicial Court Justice Francis J. Quirico. She subsequently served as an Assistant Attorney General under Attorney General Francis X. Bellotti for four years. She later served as an assistant district attorney in the office of Middlesex County District Attorney Scott Harshbarger for six years.

Botsford practiced law in the private sector as an associate at the firm of Hill & Barlow for one year before going on to serve as a partner at Rosenfeld, Botsford & Krokidas, a Boston law firm, for three years.

In 1989, Botsford was appointed as an associate justice of the Superior Court, where she served for eighteen years until her appointment to the Supreme Judicial Court after the death of Justice Martha B. Sosman.

Botsford has also taught at the Northeastern University School of Law, Massachusetts 
Continuing Legal Education (MCLE) Boston University Law School, the National Judicial College, and the Flaschner Judicial Institute.

External links

Official Profile from the Commonwealth of Massachusetts

1947 births
Living people
American women judges
Barnard College alumni
Harvard Kennedy School alumni
Justices of the Massachusetts Supreme Judicial Court
Northeastern University School of Law alumni
21st-century American women
21st-century American women judges
21st-century American judges